The Institute for Bulgarian Language (in Bulgarian: Институт за български език) is the language regulator of the Bulgarian language. It was created on May 15, 1942, and is based in Sofia.  The institute develops a national dictionary, publishes magazines on linguistic research, and offers courses, including a PhD programme. It is part of the Bulgarian Academy of Sciences.

External links
 Institute home page

Language regulators
Bulgarian language
Bulgarian culture